The Théâtre National was a Parisian theatre located across from the Bibliothèque Nationale de France on the rue de la Loi, which was the name of the rue de Richelieu from 1793 to 1806. The theatre was built by the actress and theatre manageress Mademoiselle Montansier, and opened on 15 August 1793. Other names have included Salle de la rue de la Loi, Salle de la rue de Richelieu, Salle Montansier, and Théâtre Montansier, although the latter two names have also been used to refer to two other theatres built and/or managed by Montansier: the Théâtre Montansier in Versailles and the Théâtre du Palais-Royal. The Théâtre National was designed by the architect Victor Louis and had a capacity of 2,300 spectators. The theatre was demolished in 1820, and its former site is now the Square Louvois.

The theatre served as the principal home of the Paris Opera from 26 July 1794 to 13 February 1820 during which time it was known variously as the Théâtre des Arts (1794), the Théâtre de la République et des Arts (1797), again as Théâtre des Arts (1803), the Académie Impériale de Musique (1804), the Académie Royale de Musique (1814), again as Académie Impériale de Musique during the Hundred Days of Napoleon, and finally again as the Académie Royale de Musique (1815–1820). The theatre has also been referred to as the Montansier opera house.

Architectural drawings

References

Sources 
 Donnet, Alexis; Orgiazzi, J. (1821). Architectonographie des théâtres de Paris, plates volume, plates 13 and 14. Paris: Didot l'ainé. Scanned by Google Books.  Credit: Ghent University Library.
 Pitou, Spire (1983) The Paris Opéra: an encyclopedia of operas, ballets, composers, and performers (3 volumes), vol. 1, p. 38. Westport, Connecticut: Greenwood Press. .
 Simeone, Nigel (2000). Paris: a musical gazetteer. Yale University Press. .
 Whitaker, G. B. (1827). The History of Paris from the earliest period to the present day: containing a description of its antiquities, public buildings, civil, religious, scientific, and commercial institutions (3 volumes). London: G. B. Whitaker. View volume 2 at Google Books.

Music venues completed in 1793
Opera houses in Paris
Former theatres in Paris
Theatres completed in 1793
1793 establishments in France
18th-century architecture in France